Wendy Williams: The Movie is an American television biographical film directed by Darren Grant about the life of entertainer Wendy Williams. The film premiered on January 30, 2021 on Lifetime.

Plot
Wendy Williams is a teenage girl growing up in New Jersey.

Cathy Hughes hires Williams to work in Washington, D.C., at the WOL radio station. Williams takes cocaine to suppress her appetite. She also gets a weekend job in New York City as an emcee. By 1990, she's working full-time in New York City. Hot 103.5 becomes Hot 97.

Williams remains addicted to cocaine during her marriage to Kevin Hunter. However, she finally quit cocaine.

Cast
Ciera Payton as Wendy Williams
Jamall Johnson as Eric B.
Morocco Omari as Kevin Hunter
Adrian Neblett as Charlamagne tha God
Nykeem Provo as Ricky Tony, based on Sherrick
Emy Aneke as DJ Red Alert
Rebecca Davis as program director

Reception
Jezebel.com both criticised and praised the movie.

References

External links

2021 television films
2021 films
2020s American films
2020s biographical films
2020s English-language films
American biographical films
Biographical television films
Biographical films about entertainers
Films about radio people
Films directed by Darren Grant
Films set in New Jersey
Films set in New York City
Films set in Washington, D.C.
Lifetime (TV network) films